Phagwara Assembly constituency (Sl. No.: 29) is a Punjab Legislative Assembly constituency in Kapurthala district, Punjab state, India.

Members of the Legislative Assembly

Election results

2022

2019 By-Election

2017

References

External links
  

Assembly constituencies of Punjab, India
Kapurthala district